Taman Impian Putra is a housing estate in Bangi, Selangor, Malaysia. The six-phase development was commenced in 2005 by Purcon; the first phase was completed in 2007 and the sixth in 2009. The accommodation ranges from medium-cost terraces to semi-detached houses. The development is situated next to Bandar Seri Putra and can be seen from the PLUS highway.

Hulu Langat District
Populated places in Selangor